Carmen Ranigler  (born 17 August 1976) is an Italian snowboarder. 

She was born in Bolzano. She competed at the 2006 Winter Olympics, in snowboard cross and parallel giant slalom. She competed in parallel giant slalom at the 2010 Winter Olympics.

References

External links 
 

1976 births
Living people
Italian female snowboarders
Olympic snowboarders of Italy
Snowboarders at the 2006 Winter Olympics
Snowboarders at the 2010 Winter Olympics
Sportspeople from Bolzano
21st-century Italian women